This is a list of castles and chateaux located in the Karlovy Vary Region of the Czech Republic.

A
 Andělská Hora Castle 
 Arnoltov Chateau

B

 Bečov nad Teplou Castle
 Bečov nad Teplou Chateau
 Boršengrýn Castle

C

 Cheb Castle
 Chlumek - Nový zámek Chateau
 Chlumek - Starý zámek Chateau
 Chyše Chateau

D
 Dalovice Chateau
 Děpoltovice - nový zámek Chateau
 Doubí Chateau
 Doubrava Chateau

F
 Freudenstein Castle
 Funkštejn Castle

H

 Hartenberk Chateau
 Hartenštejn Castle
 Hauenštejn Castle
 Hazlov Chateau
 Himlštejn Castle
 Hungerberg Castle

J
 Javorná Chateau
 Jindřichovice Chateau

K
 Kaceřov Chateau
 Kamenný Dvůr Chateau
 Karlovy Vary Castle
 Kladská Chateau
 Kleinštejn Castle
 Kostelní Bříza Chateau
 Kostrčany Chateau
 Kraslice Castle
 Kynžvart Castle
 Kynžvart Chateau

L

 Libá Chateau
 Lítov Chateau
 Loket Castle
 Luby u Chebu Chateau
 Luka Chateau

M
 Maleš Castle
 Mořičov Chateau

N
 Nejdek Castle
 Neuberk Castle
 Neuhaus Castle
 Nevděk Castle

O
 Ostrov Chateau

P
 Podhradí - Dolní zámek Chateau
 Podhradí - Starý (Horní) zámek Chateau

S

 Skalka Castle
 Skalná Castle
 Sokolov Chateau
 Starý Hrozňatov Chateau
 Starý Rybník - zámek Chateau
 Starý Rybník Castle
 Stružná Chateau
 Štědrá Chateau
 Štědrý hrádek Castle

T
 Toužim Chateau

V
 Valeč Chateau
 Verušičky Chateau

See also
 List of castles in the Czech Republic
 List of castles in Europe
 List of castles

External links 
 Castles, Chateaux, and Ruins 
 Czech Republic - Manors, Castles, Historical Towns
 Hrady.cz 

 
Karlovy Vary